Kartikeswar Patar (25 May 1941 – 6 October 2020) was an Indian politician for the Indian National Congress, who served as a member of the Lok Sabha from 1991 to 1996 for Balasore. Patar died in 2020 from COVID-19.

References

1941 births
2020 deaths
Lok Sabha members from Odisha
India MPs 1991–1996
Indian National Congress politicians from Odisha
People from Balasore district
Deaths from the COVID-19 pandemic in India